The U.S. state of Pennsylvania first required its residents to register their motor vehicles in 1903. Registrants provided their own license plates for display until 1906, when the state began to issue plates.

, plates are issued by the Pennsylvania Department of Transportation (PennDOT) through its Driver & Vehicle Services division. Only rear plates have been required on standard passenger vehicles since 1952. Most other classes of vehicle also only require rear plates, while front plates are additionally required on passenger vehicles owned by the state, and on vehicles owned by press photographers.

Passenger baseplates

1906 to 1958
The 1955 (dated 1956) issue was the first Pennsylvania license plate that complied with these standards.

No slogans were used on passenger plates during the period covered by this subsection.

1958 to present
Only plates issued since 1999 are currently valid for display.

Notes	
1 Plus remakes of serials issued on previous bases.

Temporary plates
Unlike many states that issue paper or cardboard temporary license plates with a new registration until the permanent registration and plates comes in, Pennsylvania almost always issues the permanent plate right away, with a temporary tag in the rear window indicating the exact date the temporary tag expires, upon which it is removed or when the full-year registration sticker for the plate comes in, whichever comes first. (Some cars do get issued a paper temporary Pennsylvania plate, usually by those who live out-of-state buying a car in Pennsylvania who need the temporary tag until the vehicle title is transferred to the state they live in.) Until April 2000, new plates had a "T" sticker to denote a temporary tag on the plate until the full-year registration came in the mail with the regular registration sticker. Pennsylvania adopted the current system to combat criminals making counterfeit "T" stickers. For plates that already had the "T" stickers but were not issued yet to vehicles at the time of the change, Pennsylvania gave car dealerships and notaries plain white stickers to cover up the "T" tags so that the plates could still be used.

Non-passenger plates

Optional plates
Pennsylvania offers many optional "special organizational" and "special fund" license plates.
 Special fund license plate proceeds are directed to organizations involved with their respective causes.

Military plates

External links
 Pennsylvania license plates, 1969–present
 Various types of Pennsylvania license plates from 1906-present
 Official website of the Commonwealth of Pennsylvania
 Official Pennsylvania tourism site
 License Plates of Pennsylvania

References

1906 in transport
1906 introductions
Pennsylvania transportation-related lists
Transportation in Pennsylvania
Pennsylvania